Épinay-sur-Orge is a station on RER C in Épinay-sur-Orge, Essonne, Paris, France. The station was opened in 1843 and is on the Paris–Bordeaux railway. The station is served by Paris' express suburban rail system, the RER. The train services are operated by SNCF.

Train services
The following services serve the station:

Local services (RER C) Saint-Martin d'Étampes–Juvisy–Paris–Issy–Versailles-Chantiers–Saint-Quentin-en-Yvelines
Local services (RER C) Dourdan–Juvisy–Paris–Issy–Versailles-Chantiers–Saint-Quentin-en-Yvelines
Local services (RER C) Dourdan–Juvisy–Paris–Ermont Eaubonne–Montigny
Local services (RER C) Brétigny–Juvisy–Paris–Ermont Eaubonne–Montigny

See also 

 List of stations of the Paris RER
 Transilien

External links 

 

Railway stations in Essonne
Réseau Express Régional stations
Railway stations in France opened in 1843